Leif William Sidney "Nenne" Boldt-Christmas (8 August 1924 – 15 October 2016) was a Swedish sailor who competed in the 1952 Summer Olympics. He was born in Göteborg. In 1952 he won the silver medal as crew member of the Swedish boat Tornado in the Dragon class.

References

External links
 
 
 
 
 

1924 births
2016 deaths
Swedish male sailors (sport)
Olympic sailors of Sweden
Sailors at the 1952 Summer Olympics – Dragon
Olympic silver medalists for Sweden
Olympic medalists in sailing
Royal Swedish Yacht Club sailors
Medalists at the 1952 Summer Olympics
Sportspeople from Gothenburg
20th-century Swedish people
21st-century Swedish people